Frontiers is a music album released by the Japanese music group Psycho le Cému by Nippon Crown. The CD contains "VISITOR", the ending theme to the anime コロッケ!(Croquette!).

Track listing
輝きの中へ… (Kagayaki no Naka e)
激愛メリーゴーランド (Gekiai Merry-Go-Round)
春夏秋冬 (Shunkashuutou)
浪漫飛行 (Roman Hikou)
VISITOR
Mind Core
凛～愛する者のために～(Rin~aisuru mono no tame ni~)
銀狼 (Gin Ookami)
DANCE II HEAVEN
BLUE AGAIN
一億のパルチザン(Ichioku no Partisan)
With
アクエリア (Hard Style)(Aquaria (Hard Style))
愛の唄 (New Mix) (Ai no Uta (New Mix))

Notes

The first press of the album came with a random figurine of one of the band members in their costumes from the "Ai no Uta" single.

Several songs were previously released as singles:
Gekiai Merry-Go-Round and Shunkashuutou originally appeared on the Gekiai Merry-Go-Round/Shunkashuutou single; Roman Hikou and BLUE AGAIN appeared on the Roman Hikou single. VISITOR was released on a single under the alias of サイコロ・コロッケ(Saikoro Korokke) containing the opening and ending themes of the anime コロッケ！(Croquette!). 
Ai no Uta and Aquaria were previously released on the Ai no Uta single, but the versions that appear on the album are new remixes.

One PV was made for the album, for the song With.

2003 albums